Kilwinning Academy is a six-year, non-denominational, secondary school with an agreed capacity of 1,330 in Kilwinning, North Ayrshire, Scotland.

The current building opened to 1st year pupils in 1976, then to 1st, 2nd and a few 3rd year pupils in 1977 before finally opening to all other school years the following year.

 Rectors/Head Teachers 
 D Young - 1977 - 1987 - Left/Retired Early - Died 2008 
 J Happs - 1987 - 1989 - Acting HT (former DHT)
 W Ballantyne - 1989 - 2002 - Retired 
 W C Armstrong - 2002 - 2011 - Retired 
 T Swan (BSc.) - 2011–Present

In 2013 a teacher at the school was struck off for making inappropriate remarks to pupils.

In 2014 the school was awarded £4000 to support a scheme to get more people involved in sports.

School building

Kilwinning Academy is rated B for the building's condition and sustainability.

Town regeneration

Kilwinning Academy S2 Art and Design pupils in 2010/11 helped Irvine Bay Regeneration in their efforts to refurbish Kilwinning's town centre by creating tiles for a mural for a tunnel leading from the shops and Abbey to the car park.

References 

Educational institutions established in 1977
Secondary schools in North Ayrshire
Kilwinning
1977 establishments in Scotland